The Professional Rodeo Cowboys Association (PRCA) is the largest rodeo organization in the world. It sanctions events in the United States, Canada, and Mexico, with members from said countries, as well as others. Its championship event is the National Finals Rodeo (NFR). The PRCA is headquartered in Colorado Springs, Colorado, United States.

History 
The organization was created in 1936 when a group of cowboys walked out of a rodeo at Boston Garden to protest the actions of rodeo promoter W.T. Johnson, who refused to add the cowboys' entry fees to the rodeo's total purse. Johnson finally gave in to the cowboys' demands, and the successful "strike" led to the formation of the Cowboys' Turtle Association. That name was chosen because, while they were slow to organize, when required they were unafraid to stick out their necks to get what they wanted, like turtles might do. Among the organizers was a woman, a four-time national bronc champion, Alice Greenough Orr. In 1945, the Turtles changed their name to the Rodeo Cowboys Association, and in 1975, the organization became the Professional Rodeo Cowboys Association. The PRCA staff consists of about 70 full-time employees, but grows to nearly 100 during the peak rodeo season. The PRCA headquarters, established in 1979 in Colorado Springs, also houses the ProRodeo Hall of Fame and Museum of the American Cowboy. In 2006, the Cheyenne Frontier Days Hall of Fame inducted the PRCA into its hall of fame.

For a list of inductees, see the List of ProRodeo Hall of Fame inductees.

Events
7 events and 9 championships are sanctioned by the PRCA.

 Bronc riding – there are two divisions in the PRCA, Bareback bronc riding, where the rider is only allowed to hang onto a bucking horse with a type of surcingle called a "rigging"; and Saddle bronc riding, where the rider uses a specialized western saddle without a horn (for safety) and hangs onto a heavy lead rope, called a bronc rein, which is attached to a halter on the horse.
 Tie-down roping –  also called calf roping, is based on ranch work in which calves are roped for branding, medical treatment, or other purposes. It is the oldest of rodeo's timed events. The cowboy ropes a running calf around the neck with a lariat, and his horse stops and sets back on the rope while the cowboy dismounts, runs to the calf, throws it to the ground and ties three feet together. (If the calf falls when roped, the cowboy must lose time waiting for the calf to get back to its feet so that the cowboy can do the work.) The job of the horse is to hold the calf steady on the rope.  A well-trained calf-roping horse will slowly back up while the cowboy ties the calf, to help keep the lariat snug.
 Steer wrestling – also known as "bulldogging," is a rodeo event where the rider jumps off his horse onto a Corriente steer and 'wrestles' it to the ground by grabbing it by the horns.  This is probably the single most physically dangerous event in rodeo for the cowboy, who runs a high risk of jumping off a running horse head first and missing the steer, or of having the thrown steer land on top of him, sometimes horns first.
 Team roping – is the only team event in rodeo. Two ropers capture and restrain a full-grown steer. One horse and rider, the "header," lassos a running steer's horns, while the other horse and rider, the "heeler," lassos the steer's two hind legs. Once the animal is captured, the riders face each other and lightly pull the steer between them, so that both ropes are taut.  This technique originated from methods of capture and restraint for treatment used on a ranch.
 Bull riding –  an event where the cowboys ride full-grown bulls instead of horses. Although skills and equipment similar to those needed for bareback bronc riding are required, the event differs considerably from horse riding competition due to the danger involved. Because bulls are unpredictable and may attack a fallen rider, rodeo clowns, now known as "bullfighters", work during bull-riding competition to distract the bulls and help prevent injury to competitors.
 Steer roping – is based on tie-down roping. Instead of a calf, the cowboy must catch and tie down a large steer (approximately 450 to 600 pounds). Unlike tie-down roping, the cowboy must first rope the steer around its horns. The steer's horns are wrapped and then reinforced with rebar. The cowboy must then toss the rope over the steer's right hip. Then he rides leftward which brings the steer down to the ground. Once the steer is on his side and the rope is tight, then he can dismount. He will run to the steer in order to tie any three legs together. As in tie-down roping, the tie must hold for six seconds.
 All-Around – the All-Around is actually an award, not an event. It is awarded to the highest money winner in two or more events.
 Barrel racing – is a timed speed and agility event. In barrel racing, horse and rider gallop around a cloverleaf pattern of barrels, making agile turns without knocking the barrels over. In professional, collegiate and high school rodeo, barrel racing is an exclusively women's sport, though men and boys occasionally compete at local O-Mok-See competition. Barrel racing takes place with other PRCA sanctioned events, but it is sanctioned by the Women’s Professional Rodeo Association (WPRA). Results are shown on that website.
 Breakaway roping – is a variation of calf roping where a calf is roped, but not thrown and tied. The roper attempts to throw a lasso around the neck of the calf. Once the rope is around the calf's neck, the roper signals the horse to stop suddenly. The rope is tied to the saddle horn with a string. When the calf hits the end of the rope, the rope is pulled tight and the string breaks. The breaking of the string marks the end of the run. In professional and collegiate rodeo, breakaway roping is exclusively a women's sport. Breakaway roping started becoming a regular event at some PRCA rodeos in 2019, making it along with barrel racing the two female events. Like barrel racing, breakaway roping is sanctioned by the WPRA and results are shown on its website.
Events source

Note: Steer roping is publicized separately and its finals are held separately at the National Finals Steer Roping (NFSR).

Tours and championships

Circuit System
There are 14 regional circuits in the PRCA; 12 of them American: Montana, Mountain States, Wilderness, Columbia River, California, Turquoise, Texas, Prairie, Badlands, Great Lakes, Southeast, and First Frontier. There are also two international circuits; the Mexico Circuit and Canada's Maple Leaf Circuit. Contestants compete in their respective regional circuits and the top ones qualify for each region’s circuit finals rodeos. Points are achieved for the top competitors in each of the circuit rodeo events held throughout the year. At the conclusion of each circuit finals rodeo, the season champion, as well as the circuit finals average champion qualify for the main championship event of the circuit system, the NFR Open. The winner in each event at the NFR Open is the National Circuit Champion for their respective event. In addition to the nine individual event winners, including heading and heeling team ropers, there is also the all-around cowboy champion, who wins the most money in two or more events. All ten winners receive the National Circuit championship belt-buckle.

The main championship event for the circuit system was previously known as the National Circuit Finals Rodeo (NCFR). The NCFR was held every spring from 1987 to 2010 in Pocatello, Idaho, before moving to Oklahoma City, Oklahoma in 2011, Guthrie, Oklahoma in 2014, and then to Kissimmee, Florida in 2015. In 2020, due to the COVID-19 pandemic, the NCFR had to be moved to a different date and location. It was ultimately held in Greeley, Colorado in September. The event itself was closed to the public and the seats were filled with socially distanced cardboard cutouts of people. In 2021, The NCFR returned to Kissimmee, Florida and took place during its normal run in the springtime, but consisted of a limited and socially distanced crowd due to the continuity of the pandemic. In 2022, the National Circuit Finals Rodeo was renamed as the NFR Open and now takes place every July at the Pikes Peak or Bust Rodeo in Colorado Springs, Colorado. 

Beginning in 2017, the national champions and finals champions of the Federación Mexicana de Rodeo (Mexican Rodeo Federation) [FMR] from the previous calendar year competed at the NCFR, and this lasted through 2020, until the COVID-19 pandemic forced the PRCA's partnership with the FMR to pause for three years. The Mexico national champions and finals champions will once again compete at the NFR Open beginning in 2023. The season and finals champions of the Maple Leaf Circuit, which was forged between a partnership with the PRCA and Canadian Professional Rodeo Association (CPRA), first competed at the NCFR in 2020 and have consistently competed at the NFR Open ever since.

Playoff Series
The top cowboys and cowgirls compete in the PRCA's 60 largest regular season rodeos where they try to earn points towards the tour finale in September, the Cinch Playoffs. It was held for several years at the Washington State Fair in Puyallup, Washington. In 2020, as a result of the COVID-19 pandemic, the finale was held in Rapid City, South Dakota. In 2021, it moved to the California Rodeo Salinas in Salinas, California. The finale returned to Puyallup in 2022. It will relocate to Sioux Falls, South Dakota in 2023. The Cinch Jeans company is the Playoffs' title sponsor. The tour was previously known as the ProRodeo Tour before changing to the Playoff Series in 2022. While money won on the tour does count toward the world standings for the National Finals Rodeo (NFR), The Playoff Series is points based. The competitor with the highest total points in each rodeo event at the end of the season is crowned the Playoff Series Champion.

World's Toughest Rodeo
This tour consists of PRCA bareback bronc riders, saddle bronc riders, and bull riders, as well as barrel racers from the WPRA competing in select midwestern and southeastern cities of the United States as annual events. Money won at each tour stop counts towards the PRCA world standings.

Xtreme Bulls
Since 2003, the PRCA has sanctioned events that feature bull riding alone called the Xtreme Bulls tour. These events are held in conjunction with less than a handful of the PRCA's several hundreds of annual rodeos. Forty PRCA bull riders compete in a select rodeo arena in a one-two-day competition, and the top 12 riders based on scores come back to the championship round. The rider with the most points on two bulls wins the event. The PRCA crowns an Xtreme Bulls tour champion every year. This is the rider who wins the most money on tour. Bull riders must compete in at least forty complete PRCA rodeos if they want the money won on the Xtreme Bulls tour to count in the world standings towards the National Finals Rodeo. Since its first year, The Xtreme Bulls tour has had Division 2 events where riders try to qualify to earn spots on the main Division 1 events. 

In 2003, the inaugural Xtreme Bulls Tour Finale was held in Kissimmee, Florida. In 2004, the tour finale was held in conjunction with the PRCA-sanctioned Ellensburg Rodeo in Ellensburg, Washington. In 2005, it was held in Reno, Nevada. From 2006 to 2008, it was held in Indianapolis, Indiana. From 2009 to 2019, it was consistently held in conjunction with the Ellensburg Rodeo. In 2020, because of the COVID-19 pandemic, the Ellensburg Rodeo was cancelled, and thus the Xtreme Bulls Tour Finale had to be moved somewhere else. It was ultimately held in Nephi, Utah. Since 2021, the Xtreme Bulls Tour Finale has taken place in Pendleton, Oregon; held in conjunction with the PRCA-sanctioned Pendleton Round-Up.

Xtreme Broncs
First approved by the PRCA in 2016, this tour features only saddle bronc riding competition. Like the Xtreme Bulls tour, these events are held in conjunction with a very small amount of the PRCA's several hundreds of annual regular season rodeos. At the Xtreme Broncs Tour Finale, held every August since 2019 in Rapid City, South Dakota, the top 12 saddle bronc riders in the PRCA world standings, plus the top 12 saddle bronc riders in the Xtreme Broncs tour standings not already in the top 12 PRCA world standings compete at the event. Money won on the Xtreme Broncs tour counts towards the PRCA world standings for the National Finals Rodeo.

Legacy Steer Roping
Since 2019, the PRCA has sanctioned steer roping events for contestants aged 50 and over called the Legacy Steer Roping tour. Ropers must compete in at least four Legacy Steer Roping events and have won at least one dollar in each event in order to qualify for the Legacy Steer Roping Finals held in November in Mulvane, Kansas for the chance of being crowned the tour champion.

National Circuit Finals Steer Roping
The National Circuit Finals Steer Roping (NCFSR), takes place in Torrington, Wyoming. The top 35 steer ropers from the 12 PRCA regional American circuits compete at the annual two-day event for the chance of winning the National Circuit Steer Roping title. The inaugural NCFSR was in 2010.

National Finals Steer Roping
At the end of the regular season, the top 15 steer ropers in the PRCA world standings compete at the National Finals Steer Roping (NFSR). This annual event held every November in Mulvane, Kansas, is separate from the National Finals Rodeo (NFR) and different from the National Circuit Finals Steer Roping (NCFSR). After two days of competition, the contestant who has won the most money throughout the season, including at the NFSR is crowned the PRCA world champion steer roper. Since 2019, the Legacy Steer Roping Finals have been held in conjunction with the NFSR.

Permit Finals
The PRCA held the Permit Member of the Year Challenge in which the top five permit holders in each of the standard male rodeo events at the end of the regular season competed for the chance of being crowned the Permit Member of the Year in their respective events. This one-day event was held every December at the South Point Hotel Arena & Equestrian Center in Las Vegas, Nevada, just shortly before the start of the National Finals Rodeo. However, because of COVID-19 restrictions in Nevada, the 2020 edition of the event took place at the Cowtown Coliseum in Fort Worth, Texas. The Permit Member of the Year Challenge returned to the South Point Hotel Arena & Equestrian Center in Las Vegas in 2021. First time PRCA members compete on a permit, and must win a certain amount of money before they earn their full-time PRCA membership card. The top five money-earning permit holders competed in two rounds each and the ones who had earned the most money throughout the year were each crowned the Permit Member of the Year. The Permit Member of the Year Challenge had been held since 2009, although in its first five years, only the roughstock events (bareback riding, saddle bronc riding and bull riding) were featured. The timed events (steer wrestling, team roping and tie-down roping) were added in 2014.

The Permit Member of the Year Challenge in Las Vegas crowned the year-end Permit Members of the Year from 2009 to 2021. However, in 2022, the permit championship event was changed. Since that year, the Permit Finals has been held at the Heart O’ Texas Fair & Rodeo in Waco, Texas in October as a three-day event. The six primary PRCA male events (bareback riding, steer wrestling, team roping, saddle bronc riding, tie-down roping, and bull riding), as well as the two female WPRA events included at PRCA rodeos (breakaway roping and barrel racing) are featured, and the top ten permit holders in each event compete throughout the Permit Finals for the chance of winning the Permit Member of the Year title in each respective event. The Permit Member of the Year Challenge in Las Vegas continues to take place before the start of the National Finals Rodeo. However, it now features the top five permit holders in each rodeo event at the conclusion of the Permit Finals and is held as a regular-season event.

National Finals Rodeo
The top 15 money winners in each PRCA discipline (including the top 15 "headers" and "heelers" in team roping) at the end of the regular season earn a trip to the National Finals Rodeo every December. The event is commonly called the National Finals or NFR. The inaugural National Finals Rodeo in 1959 took place in Dallas, Texas, and the event would remain there through 1961. From 1962 to 1964, the NFR took place in Los Angeles, California. From 1965 to 1984, it took place in Oklahoma City, Oklahoma. Since 1985, the NFR has been held at the Thomas & Mack Center in Las Vegas, Nevada. However, in 2020 due to COVID-19 restrictions in Nevada, the NFR was temporarily moved to Globe Life Field in Arlington, Texas with a limited and socially distanced crowd for each day of competition. The NFR returned to the Thomas & Mack Center in Las Vegas in 2021. Rodeo action is held over 10 consecutive days at the National Finals, with the top money winner for the year crowned the year's PRCA World Champion in each discipline at the end of the NFR. Because of the large amount of money (10 million dollars) at stake in the NFR, the leaders in each event going into the NFR are often dethroned for the year's championship at that event.

Television and streaming

Throughout its history, PRCA events were televised on channels such as ABC, ESPN, TNN, the Outdoor Life Network, the Outdoor Channel, Fox Sports Networks, Great American Country, MAVTV and CBS Sports Network.

Since 2020, PRCA events have been televised live on The Cowboy Channel and streamed live on the subscription-based The Cowboy Channel Plus application.

Champions and hall of fame 
The National Finals Rodeo and the National Finals Steer Roping award their champions and awards yearly at the end of the year and those awards are tracked in a separate article.
The PRCA's board runs the Hall of Fame. More than 100 people and livestock are nominated each year, but only a few are selected.

Miss Rodeo America 
The Miss Rodeo America pageant is held annually in Las Vegas, Nevada, every December. Miss Rodeo America is the official spokesperson for the PRCA. It is held alongside the National Finals Rodeo.

See also
 List of Professional Rodeo Cowboys Association Champions
 List of Professional Bull Riders Champions
 List of ProRodeo Hall of Fame inductees
 Bull Riding Hall of Fame
 Professional Bull Riders
 ProRodeo Hall of Fame
 American Bucking Bull
 International Professional Rodeo Association
Bull Riders Only
Championship Bull Riding
Women's Professional Rodeo Association
Canadian Professional Rodeo Association
 Federación Mexicana de Rodeo
 Australian Professional Rodeo Association

References

Additional sources

External links
 Official Website

Rodeo organizations
Organizations based in Colorado Springs, Colorado
Sports in Colorado Springs, Colorado
Rodeo competition series
Rodeo in the United States
Sports in Las Vegas
Organizations established in 1936
Rodeo